The Toward & Philipson was an English steam car manufactured for one year only, 1897.  It was a coke-fired wagonette with a three-stage tubular boiler, and could seat six.

References
David Burgess Wise, The New Illustrated Encyclopedia of Automobiles.

Vehicles introduced in 1897
1890s cars
Defunct motor vehicle manufacturers of the United Kingdom
Steam cars